Laurie Anne Rinker (born September 28, 1962) is an American professional golfer who played on the LPGA Tour in the 1980s, 1990s and early 2000s.

Amateur career 
Rinker was born and raised in Stuart, Florida.  She attended the University of Florida in Gainesville, Florida, where she played for coach Mimi Ryan's Florida Gators women's golf team from 1980 to 1982.  She was recognized as an All-American in 1980 and 1982, and qualified for the LPGA Tour in the summer between her junior and senior year of college.  She completed her education by traveling to the University of Florida during off weeks, and graduated with a bachelor's degree in finance in 1983.

Professional career 
Rinker's best years in professional golf came in the mid-1980s, and included two LPGA Tour wins: the 1984 Boston Five Classic and the 1986 LPGA Corning Classic.  Her best finishes in the LPGA majors included a seventh place in the 1984 Nabisco Dinah Shore, a tie for third in the 1987 LPGA Championship, and a tie for seventh in the 1995 du Maurier Classic.  The most lucrative year of her career was 1987, when she earned $158,916 and had nine top-10 finishes.  To date, she has won over $1,200,000 as a professional golfer.

As the winner of the 2015 LPGA Teaching and Club Professionals Championship, she is qualified for the inaugural U.S. Senior Women's Open in 2018 through 2020 as an eligible winner of the past five editions of the said tournament.

Family 
Rinker's two brothers, Larry and Lee, have played on the PGA Tour.  She competed under her married name, Laurie Rinker-Graham, from 1992 to 2003.  She has two sons, Brent and Timothy.

Amateur wins 
1980 U.S. Girls' Junior
1982 Doherty Challenge Cup

Professional wins

LPGA Tour wins (2)

LPGA of Japan Tour wins (1)
1984 Chukyo TV Bridgestone Ladies Open

Other wins
1985 JCPenney Classic (with brother Larry Rinker)
2015 LPGA Teaching and Club Professionals Championship.

Legends Tour wins (4)
2011 Women's Senior National Invitational
2013 ISPS Handa Legends Open Championship
2014 The Legends Championship
2015 Chico's Patty Berg Memorial

Team appearances
Professional
Handa Cup (representing the United States): 2013, 2014 (winners), 2015 (winners)

See also 

List of Florida Gators women's golfers on the LPGA Tour
List of University of Florida alumni

References

External links 

American female golfers
Florida Gators women's golfers
LPGA Tour golfers
Golfers from Florida
People from Stuart, Florida
1962 births
Living people